Johnson City Square Deal Arch is a historic "welcome arch" located at Johnson City in Broome County, New York. It is one of two identical arches erected in 1920 in Johnson City and in nearby Endicott, known as the Endicott Square Deal Arch. It was originally constructed by Endicott-Johnson Shoe Company employees to honor  George F. Johnson (1857–1948), their highly respected employer and benefactor.

After being dismantled in 1976 due to deterioration, it was rebuilt in 1982 in the same location. 

It was listed on the National Register of Historic Places in 2001.

References

Arches and vaults in the United States
Arch
History of Broome County, New York
Buildings and structures completed in 1920
Historic American Buildings Survey in New York (state)
National Register of Historic Places in Broome County, New York